Ali Jaan is a town in the Balochistan province of Pakistan, located at  . It was near the epicentre of the 1935 Quetta earthquake that struck on 31 May 1935.

References

Populated places in Balochistan, Pakistan